Redcoat is the name given to frontline staff at Butlins holiday camps in the UK. A Redcoat has duties ranging from adult entertainer or children's entertainer to stewarding.

History

The first Redcoat was Norman Bradford. When Sir Billy Butlin opened his first Butlin's in Skegness he realised that his guests were not engaging with activities in the way he had envisioned: most kept to themselves, and others looked bored. He asked Bradford – who was engaged as an engineer, constructing the camp – to take on the duty of entertaining the guests which he did with a series of icebreakers and jokes. By the end of the night the camp was buzzing and the Butlins atmosphere was born.

The same night Butlin decided that for his camp to work he would require an army of people to carry out the same job as Norman, and the role of Redcoat was formed.

Uniform

To make his new army stand out, Butlin asked Norman to purchase a uniform. Norman later returned with a jacket in the camp colours of, blue, primrose yellow and white; however, Butlin found the look to be too authoritarian and decided they should wear red blazers with white lapels, and this became the Redcoat uniform. The first uniforms were made by Billie Ditchfield who became one of the first two female Redcoats (the other was Kay Berry).

Over the years the uniform has changed several times, but has always retained the core component of a red blazer (despite a proposal to replace them with red jumpsuits in the 1970s). In the 1960s and 1970s, braid and badges were added to the blazers. Famous designers such as Jeff Banks and Zandra Rhodes have redesigned the uniforms. To mark Butlins' 75th anniversary, the uniform was re-designed very similar to the original design consisting of red blazer with dark braiding and a badge with the letters "BHC" on it (standing for "Butlins Holiday Camps") with  white trousers or skirt. This uniform was worn throughout 2011 for the anniversary celebration, and from early 2016 it has once again become the permanent redcoat uniform.

Recruitment and training 

The Redcoats undergo a tough selection process. Despite this they are still paid only minimum wage and members of the 'triple threat' cast team (such as the skyline gang) are paid more. Recruitment roadshows are held nationally on a yearly basis. In these roadshows prospective Redcoats have to show customer service and guest-facing skills (contrary to the popular belief that they need to be able to sing and dance, which is no longer the case).

In 1999 Butlins introduced the now defunct Butlins 'Academies of Excellence' to train Redcoats. These have since been replaced with a six-week training course. There is also the option of a foundation degree in either musical theatre, or Technical Skills for the Arts and Leisure Industry. Training includes aspects of direction and production and time spent as a Butlins Redcoat counts toward membership of Equity.

Roles
Redcoats work in three areas, General duties, the Kid's Club and the costume character team. General duties are similar to those of a tour rep in a resort – Butlins even describe the role as "The Original Holiday Rep". In the evening the Redcoats form part of the live entertainment team, starring in Gangshows and X Factor style game shows. Throughout the years, Redcoats have been expected to lead ballroom dances, stage and judge competitions, and steward theatrical performances as well as meeting and greeting guests in public areas. Redcoats run the children's clubs which provide sporting activities, competitions and arts and crafts. Each Redcoat will have many different roles to fulfil in any given week.

Similar staff

Butlins remained the largest holiday camp chain in the UK, but smaller camps copied the Redcoat style of staffing. In the 1960s, Fred Pontin adopted the Bluecoat to represent at Pontins holiday camps, and at some point, Harry Warner decided Warners' holiday camps should adopt the Greencoat.

Media appearances
The ITV series Redcoats was a docusoap following the lives of Redcoats at Butlins Minehead and Bognor resorts. Over three series of 30-minute episodes, it shows the selection process, the Redcoats entertaining the visitors and life behind the scenes. The series was made by Pilgrim Productions.

In fiction
The BBC television series Hi-de-Hi!, written by former Butlins employees Jimmy Perry (a Redcoat) and David Croft (a summer show actor), featured the Yellowcoats as a fictional analogue. The title of the show "Hi-de-Hi" originated with Norman Bradford who claimed to have taken it from an American film; he began using this as a cheer to which the audience spontaneously responded "Ho-de-ho".

Another BBC television series, Doctor Who, featured an episode entitled "Delta and the Bannermen", which depicted an alien attack on the fictitious Shangri-La holiday camp (in reality the Butlins camp at Barry Island). As with the real camp, Shangri-La was staffed with Redcoats played by extras.

In the film adaptation of The Who's rock opera Tommy (directed by  Ken Russell), Tommy's stepfather Frank (portrayed by Oliver Reed) becomes acquainted with Tommy's widowed mother (Ann Margaret) during his employ as a Greencoat at the fictional Bernie's Holiday Camp.

The book The Butlins Girls by Elaine Everest is predominantly set at the Skegness camp in 1946, the first year of its re-opening after the war. It features the fictional redcoats Molly Missons, Bunty Grainger, Plum Appleby and Johnny Johnson.
There is also a children's book from the 1960s by Frank Richards called Billy Bunter at Butlins. In this book, there is a Redcoat known as Freddie, and Billy Butlin himself appears.

Notable former Redcoats
A number of entertainers have been Redcoats in the early stages of their careers. Becoming a Redcoat is seen as a way into show business, as it allows a performer to become established as a professional for the purposes of joining the Equity trade union which then allows the performer to work freely throughout the industry. In exceptional cases a Redcoat may even become notable whilst in the employment of Butlins; Stephen Mulhern notably performed on the Royal Variety Performance in 1997 whilst still working as a Redcoat, and in the past notable singers have had chart hits. Clinton Ford, for instance, reached number 27 in 1959 with "Old Shep" just after completing his final summer season at Pwllheli. However, prior to this, in 1957 Russ Hamilton recorded a UK number 2 hit, "We Will Make Love" (held off the top spot by Elvis Presley's "All Shook Up"). Shortly after this, he recorded a number 4 US Billboard hit, "Rainbow", during which Hamilton continued to entertain Butlins guests. It was Billy Butlin himself who asked Hamilton to record "We Will Make Love" for the benefit of Butlins guests.

Other artists have gone on to find success building on the skills they learned as a Redcoat, such as Des O'Connor, Jimmy Tarbuck, and Michael Barrymore. The role is an important part of the entertainment and tourism culture of the United Kingdom, and even today former Redcoats are regularly identified in the press and in books by this role, even though it may only have been a small part of their career.

Other famous Redcoats include Ted Rogers, a comedian best known as the presenter of the variety/game show 3-2-1, Northern Irish entertainer Jimmy Cricket.
 
The writer P. J. Kavanagh also did a stint as a Redcoat, and described his experiences in his book The Perfect Stranger (1966).

Comedian Dave Allen was also a Redcoat.

Notes

External links
 http://www.butlinsonline.co.uk

 
Entertainment occupations